Suwon is the capital and largest city of Gyeonggi-do, South Korea's most populous province which surrounds Seoul, the national capital. It is traditionally known as "The City of Filial Piety". With a population close to 1.3 million, it is larger than Ulsan, although it is not governed as a metropolitan city.

Suwon has existed in various forms throughout Korea's history, growing from a small settlement to become a major industrial and cultural center. It is the only remaining completely walled city in South Korea. The city walls are one of the more popular tourist destinations in Gyeonggi Province. Samsung Electronics R&D center and headquarters are in Suwon. The city is served by three motorways, the national railway network, and the Seoul Metropolitan Subway. Suwon is a major educational center, home to eleven universities.

Suwon is home to several football, baseball, basketball and volleyball teams, including four-time K League champions and two-time AFC Champions League winner football club Suwon Samsung Bluewings and 2021 Korean Series champions KT Wiz of the Korea Baseball Organization.

History
In ancient tribal times, Suwon was known as Mosu-guk of Mahan confederacy. During the Proto–Three Kingdoms period era, however, the area comprising modern Suwon and Hwaseong City was called Maehol-gun.

In 757, under King Gyeongdeok of the Unified Silla, the name was changed to Suseong-gun. In 940 during the Goryeo dynasty changed again in to Suju. King Taejong of the Joseon dynasty renamed the city to Suwon in 1413.

In 1592, during the Imjin wars, Commander Yi Kwang attempted to launch his army toward the capital city, Seoul (at the time called Hanseong). The army was withdrawn, however, after news that the city had already been sacked reached the commander. As the army grew in size to 50,000 men with the accumulation of several volunteer forces, Yi Kwang and the irregular commanders reconsidered their aim to reclaim the capital, and led the combined forces north to Suwon.

Construction of Hwaseong
Later, during the Joseon Dynasty, King Jeongjo made a successful attempt to make Suwon the nation's capital in 1796. Part of this project was the construction of Hwaseong Fortress, a fortified wall running around the entire city partially intended to guard the tomb of his father, Prince Sado, which he had located there.

The walls were one of Korea's first examples of paid labour, (corvée labour being common previously). The walls still exist today, though they (together with the fortress) were damaged severely during the Korean War.

Hwaseong originally was constructed under the guidance of philosopher Jeong Yag-yong. Shortly after the death of King Jeongjo (1800), a white paper detailing the construction of the fortress was published. This proved invaluable during its reconstruction in the 1970s.

The fortress walls once encircled the entire city, but modern urban growth has seen the city spread out far beyond the fortress. The walls are now a designated UNESCO World Heritage site, and often are used in materials promoting the city.

Korean War

The Korean War greatly affected Suwon, as the city changed hands four times. Very shortly after the outbreak of war, the 49th Fighter Wing of the United States Air Force was dispatched to Korea from Japan. Its first task was to evacuate civilians from Suwon and Gimpo, but Suwon soon fell to the advancing North Koreans. Shortly before the Battle of Osan, the first conflict between United States and North Korean forces, on July 4, 1950, defenses were erected on the road between Suwon and nearby Osan (then still under Southern command). The next day, Northern troops advanced south. In the 3½-hour battle which followed, 150 American and 42 North Korean soldiers were killed and the United States troops were forced to retreat. The North Korean advance southwards to take Osan was delayed by an estimated seven hours.

On December 16, 1950, the Greek Expeditionary Force relocated to Suwon, attached to the US 1st Cavalry Division. From November 6, 1951, the United States Air Force's top fighter pilot Gabby Gabreski was in charge of K-13 Air Base in Suwon. By the end of the war, Suwon was in South Korea. A memorial to the French military stands in Jangan-gu, near the Yeongdong Expressway's North Suwon exit.

Recent history
Suwon became the capital of Gyeonggi-do on June 23, 1967.
On July 1, 1988, Jangan-gu and Gwonseon-gu was installed.
On February 1, 1993, part of Jangan-gu and Gwonseon-gu	was separated and these parts became a new district, Paldal-gu.
On November 24, 2003, Yeongtong-gu was installed newly to separate part of Paldal-gu

Geography

Suwon lies in the north of the Gyeonggi plain, just south of South Korea's capital, Seoul. It is bordered by Uiwang to the north-west, Yongin to the east, the city of Hwaseong to the south-west, and also shares a short border with Ansan to the west.

There are a few hills around Suwon. The highest of these is Gwanggyosan to the north, on the border with Yongin, though those to the east are more numerous.

Most of the streams passing through Suwon originate on Gwanggyosan or other nearby peaks. Since Suwon is bounded to the east by other hills, the streams, chiefly the Suwoncheon (and one notable tributary being the Jungbocheon), flow southwards through the city, eventually emptying into the Yellow Sea at Asan Bay. The entirety of Suwon is drained in this manner.

As is true of all the South Korean mainland, there are no natural lakes in Suwon. There are, however, many small reservoirs, namely Seoho near Hwaseo Station, Ilwon Reservoir near Sungkyunkwan University, Bambat Reservoir near Sungkyunkwan University Station, Ilwang Reservoir in Manseok Park, Pajang Reservoir near the North Suwon exit of the Yeongdong Expressway, Gwanggyo Reservoir at the foot of Gwanggyosan, Woncheon and Sindae Reservoirs ( & ) near Ajou University, Geumgok Reservoir, a small reservoir at the foot of Chilbosan, and the larger Wangsong Reservoir, located mainly in the city of Uiwang, but its dam located in Suwon.

Climate
Suwon has a humid continental climate (Köppen: Dwa), but can be considered a borderline humid subtropical climate (Köppen: Cwa) using the  isotherm.

Administrative divisions

The city is divided into 4 gu (districts):

The newest of these is Yeongtong-gu, which was separated from Paldal-gu on November 24, 2003. These districts are in turn divided into 42 dong. Gwanggyo Town (Hanja: 光敎, Mean:teaching light) was created in surrounding Yeongtong-gu of Suwon and Suji-gu of Yongin (2011).

Demographics
50.2% of the population of Suwon is composed of male residents.  Indeed, it is only in Paldal-gu that the number of female residents is greater than that of males. 1.85% of the population is of foreign nationality, the highest concentration (2.3%) being in Paldal-gu. Further information regarding the residents of each district is shown below.

Overall, the population of Suwon is increasing, but the domestic population is falling. For example, the Korean population of Suwon fell by 585 from December 2007 to January 2008.  However, both genders of the foreign population increased in number in each gu in the same time period. It appears to be a pattern that the foreign population is increasing, as Suwon also saw a 13% increase in the number of registered foreigners residing in the city in the first half of 2007.  The only gu currently showing an increase in population is Gwonseon-gu (though the same was until recently true of Paldal-gu), while all others have falling number of residents, especially Jangan-gu and Yeongtong-gu.

Education

Colleges and universities

There are 11 universities in Suwon and 2 colleges, and these include Sungkyunkwan University's Natural Sciences Campus, Kyonggi University, Ajou University, Kyunghee University, Dongnam Health College, Gukje Digital University, Hapdong Theological Seminary, and Suwon Women's College. Contrary to its name, University of Suwon is not actually in Suwon, but in the neighbouring city of Hwaseong due to changes in municipal boundaries over the years. The agricultural campus of Seoul National University was located in Suwon until 2005, but is now in Gwanak-gu, Seoul near the rest of its main campus.

There are also 2 junior colleges in Suwon.

Primary and secondary schools
There are 33 high schools, 37 middle schools, 81 primary schools and 107 kindergartens in Suwon.

Suwon has three schools devoted to special education, namely the Jahye Institute, the School of Suwon Seokwang and Dream Tree Special School, and also has wings of mainstream schools for students requiring special education, being the Special Education School of Suwonbuk Middle School, the Special Education School of Suwon Girls' Middle School.

International schools:
 Gyeonggi Suwon International School
 Suwon Chinese International School

Industry
The main industrial employer in Suwon is Samsung. Samsung was originally founded in Seoul, but at the beginning of the Korean War, Samsung facilities were so damaged that the founder, Lee Byung-chul was forced to relocate his business to Suwon in 1951. Samsung Electronics was founded in Suwon in 1969 and it now has its headquarters and a large R&D complex in central Suwon; it is the city's largest employer. The company's long-standing relationship with the city is also seen in its sponsorship of various Suwon-based sports teams, including the football club Suwon Samsung Bluewings and two of the oldest basketball teams in domestic basketball Seoul Samsung Thunders and Samsung Life Blueminx, both of which have since moved out of Suwon. Other companies with offices here include SK, Samsung LED, Samsung SDI, Samsung Electro-Mechanics and others.

Culture

Hwaseong Fortress is Suwon's most notable attraction. Built in 1796, the entire city used to be encircled by the walls, but now Suwon has expanded beyond this boundary. Hwaseong is also listed as a UNESCO World Heritage Site. Haenggung Palace, within Hwaseong, is another noteworthy historical attraction. On completion of the Bundang Line extension, Suwon will also be only a few stops from Singal, the location of the Korean Folk Village, and the Everland theme park is nearby in Yongin.

Recreation
The path around the walls of Hwaseong Fortress is used by locals and tourists for sightseeing and walking. Manseok Park in northern Suwon has a 1200m track around a lake. Other facilities at Manseok Park include tennis (indoor & outdoor), soccer (dirt and artificial turf) and the Suwon X-Games skatepark. Various other parks are dotted around Suwon and several ski resorts and hiking trails are within easy reach of the city.

Travel and tourism
Including Suwon Hwaseong, Suwon city offers various tracking, tour and festivals for tourists. Suwon Hwaseong Festival is a festival held every October at Hwaseong Fortress.

Sports
Suwon has several sports facilities, including an archery field, badminton courts, ten-pin bowling lanes, indoor swimming pools, tennis courts, soft tennis courts and football pitches.

Suwon Gymnasium hosted the handball events in the 1988 Summer Olympics. It has a capacity of 5,145 and since been repurposed for basketball and, more recently, volleyball.

Suwon is home to the Suwon World Cup Stadium, a venue built for the 2002 FIFA World Cup and home of the K League 1 team Suwon Samsung Bluewings. Another K League 1 team, Suwon FC, and a women's team Suwon FC Women, which competes in the WK League, both play at the Suwon Sports Complex.

Since 2015, Suwon has been home of the KBO League team KT Wiz. The team plays at the Suwon Baseball Stadium. The city was previously the home of the Hyundai Unicorns, but the team folded after the 2007 season. 

Basketball teams Samsung Thunders (men's basketball team) and Samsung Life Bichumi (women's basketball team) were also based in Suwon in the past and are two of the KBL and WKBL's oldest franchises. In 2021, the KT Sonicboom men's basketball team relocated from Busan to Suwon.

Suwon is home to both a men's volleyball team and a women's volleyball team, which are Suwon KEPCO Vixtorm and Suwon Hyundai Engineering & Construction Hillstate respectively. The two teams play in the V-League.

Entertainment
Suwon has three major multiplex theaters: Megabox and CGV theaters in the Suwon Station complex in the city center, as well as Kinex 5 in the district of Yeongtong-gu. There are also other theaters that show fewer foreign films: Cinema Town, Taehan Theater, Piccadilly Theater, Jungang Theater, Royal Theater, Dano Theater and Dano Art Hall.

Woncheon in the Yeongtong-gu district also has two amusement parks, Woncheon Greenland and Woncheon Lakeland. But now it is closed.

There is Gwanggyo Lake Park behind the back gate of Kyonggi University. Nearby there has also [Lotte Cinema] theater in Lotte Outlets. There are many cafes and restaurants.

Other amenities
Suwon City Council prides itself on the condition of its public lavatories. It has made efforts in recent years to ensure that new lavatories are clean and while improving existing facilities. There are now guided bus tours of the municipal restrooms offered for visitors.

Transport

Suwon is a regional transportation hub and Suwon Station is an important stop on the Gyeongbu railway line between Seoul and Busan. There is a bus service to the KTX high-speed train station at Gwangmyeong. Suwon is connected to Seoul and other nearby cities by city and express buses with departure points across the city. There are also two bus terminals in Suwon with inter-city and express bus connections to most cities in Korea. These are Suwon Bus Terminal, which is located near 'Hotel Ramada' and West Suwon Bus Terminal, which is located near Sungkyunkwan University. KTX trains also make limited number of stops on services from Seoul to Busan.

Suwon has several stations on Seoul Subway Line 1, which runs North–South through the city, namely Sungkyunkwan University, Hwaseo, Suwon and Seryu. The Suin-Bundang Line also crosses Suwon East-West, namely Cheongmyeong, Yeongtong, Mangpo, Maetan-Gwonseon, Suwon City Hall, Maegyo, Suwon, Gosaek, Omokcheon. The Shinbundang Line also passes Suwon, namely Gwanggyo Jungang, Gwanggyo. Until 1973, the Suryo Line also connected Suwon to Yeoju.

The Yeongdong Expressway (Number 50) passes through Suwon and two exits on this motorway lie within the city limits, being North Suwon and East Suwon. Suwon is also served by the Suwon exit of the Gyeongbu Expressway (Number 1), though this lies a short distance east of the Suwon's limits, near Singal in the city of Yongin. The Pyeongtaek-Munsan Expressway (Number 17) passes Suwon and there is one exit at Suwon.

In 2013, the city hosted the EcoMobility World Festival in the Haenggun-dong neighbourhood (pop. 4,300), where for a month, streets were closed to cars as a car-free experiment. Instead of cars, residents used non-motorized vehicles provided by the festival organizers. The experiment was not unopposed; however, on balance it was considered a success. Following the festival, the city embarked on discussions about adopting the practice on a permanent basis.

In 2017, Suwon Station transfer center was opened. It was installed to disperse buses and taxi stands in the eastern plaza of Suwon Station.

Media
There are two newspapers based in Suwon. These are the Gyeonggi Daily (경기일보) and, since 1960, the Gyeongin Daily (경인일보). The former is based in Jangan-gu, with the latter's offices being in Paldal-gu. Both feature news exclusively in Korean.

Military
The Air Force has a base in Jang-ji dong, Gwon-sun gu, Suwon. This was used by the United States Air Force during the Korean War. The base is now occupied mostly by the ROKAF (Republic of Korea Air Force), though the US Army houses half of a battalion there presently, and there are a limited number of US Air Force personnel.

Religion

As in most of South Korea, according to 2006 statistics compiled by the government, about 25.3% of the population professes to follow no particular religion. Christians account for 20% of the population and Buddhists 52%. The Catholic Diocese of Suwon was created in 1963 by Pope Paul VI.

Food

Suwon is known for Suwon galbi, a variation on the style beef short rib enjoyed throughout Korea. The city also has the same variety of Korean dishes served throughout the peninsula and has a wide variety of restaurants serving food from outside Korea. Since 1995, Galbi festival has been held annually, attracting many tourists.

Flora and fauna
Suwon's wildlife is similar to that of most of Gyeonggi-do. A notable species, however, is the Suwon tree frog. This is one of only two tree frogs to inhabit the Korean peninsula and it lives in the Gyeonggi-do area only.

Notable residents
Notable people from Suwon include:
Former footballer Park Ji-sung grew up in Suwon. In 2005, a city street was renamed after him.
Actor Song Kang
Professional tennis player Chung Hyeon
Super Junior member Shindong
Shinee member Lee Jin-ki (stage name Onew)
Pastor Billy Kim, former President of the Baptist World Alliance and current President of the Far East Broadcasting Company
2AM member Jo Kwon
Cellist Han-na Chang
Actress Hyun Young
Actress Ha Ji-won
Presenter and columnist Sam Oh
MMA fighter Dong Hyun Kim
Actor Joo Won
Monsta X member I.M
Apink member Yoon Bo-mi
Twice member Yoo Jeong-yeon
Block B member U-Kwon
A.C.E member Donghun
Actor Ryu Jun-yeol
4Minute member Jeon Ji-yoon
BtoB member Lee Chang-sub
Actor Lee Jong-suk
Astro member MJ
Red Velvet member Seulgi – moved from Ansan to Suwon
DIA member Jueun
Golden Child member Lee Jang-jun
Enhypen member Sunoo
ITZY member Shin Yu-na
Actor  Park Hae-soo

Twin towns – sister cities

Suwon is twinned with:
 
 Asahikawa, Japan (1989)
 Jinan, China (1993)
 Townsville, Australia (1997)
 Bandung, Indonesia (1997)
 Yalova, Turkey (1999)
 Cluj-Napoca, Romania (1999)
 Toluca, Mexico (1999)
 Fez, Morocco (2003)
 Hải Dương Province, Vietnam (2004)
 Siem Reap Province, Cambodia (2004)
 Nizhny Novgorod, Russia (2005)
 Curitiba, Brazil (2006)
 Freiburg im Breisgau, Germany (2015)

See also
 List of cities in South Korea
 Geography of South Korea
 Seoul National Capital Area

Notes

References

Citations

Bibliography
 .

External links

City government website (in Korean)

Suwon : Official Seoul City Tourism
Suwon Samsung Bluewings official site
Official site of Hwaseong fortress (archived 2013)

 

 
Cities in Gyeonggi Province